"The Obvious Child" is a song recorded by American singer-songwriter Paul Simon. It was the lead single from his eighth studio album, The Rhythm of the Saints (1990), released by Warner Bros. Records. Written by Simon, its lyrics explore mortality and aging. The song is accompanied by a performance from Brazilian drumming collective Olodum in a live recording.

The single, released in September 1990, was commercially successful, performing well on charts worldwide. In the United States, it was mainly successful on the Album Rock Tracks chart, where it peaked at number 21. Outside the US, "The Obvious Child" was a top 15 hit in the United Kingdom and the Netherlands. The song received highly positive reviews upon its release. Simon promoted the song alongside Olodum in a performance on Saturday Night Live. The song also influenced popular culture; it is the namesake of the 2014 film Obvious Child.

Background
The rhythm tracks are performed by Grupo Cultural Olodum, a drumming collective ("bloco afro") directed by "Neguinho do Samba" (Alves de Souza) and also signed to Warner Bros. It, like many songs on The Rhythm of the Saints, was recorded live in the streets of Pelourinho Square of Salvador, Brazil in February 1988. Microphones were hung from windows or on telephone poles to capture the performances. According to Simon, "Hundreds of people gathered. It was an amazing day — an amazing recording experience." The vocal track was recorded at the Hit Factory in New York City.

Composition

The song's drum introduction is indebted to "Madagascar", a song by Olodum from their 1987 LP Egito Madagáscar. Writer Steve Sullivan writes that the figure is a "standard device" for the group, who also employ abbreviated versions of it elsewhere on the album: "Salvador Nao Inerte" and "Vinheta Cuba-Brasil". Following this, the song breaks into an instrumental fragment that, according to Stephen Holden of The New York Times, echoes the Silhouettes' 1957 doo-wop hit, "Get a Job". Holden also compared the song's conclusion to another doo-wop song, The Charts' "Desirie" (1957).

The song's lyrics thematically relate to a fear of aging and leaving behind the "boldness of youth," according to Sullivan. Holden considered it a story of an everyman pondering the uncertainty of life whilst navigating his high school yearbook. Rolling Stone John Mcalley too found it an everyman battling the fact that his "days have become defined by their limitations and dogged ordinariness." For The Rhythm of the Saints, Simon was inspired by poet Derek Walcott, and would base first-draft lyrics on his poems. Simon attempted to match the rhythmic quality of the composition with his lyrics, whether that meant a lyric was meaningless or not. A lyric relating to "the cross is in the ballpark," for example, has no meaning; Simon said, "I found [it] to be a satisfying rhythmic phrase against the drums."

Chart performance
"The Obvious Child" performed well on singles charts in several territories worldwide. In the United States, the song reached a peak of number 92 on the Billboard Hot 100 on January 5, 1991; it spent five weeks on the chart as a whole. It performed better on the magazine's Mainstream Rock Tracks chart, where it placed at number 21 on November 10, 1990, and on the Modern Rock Tracks chart, where it reached a peak of number 24 a week earlier on November 3. It had more longevity on the former chart, where it spent ten weeks total. In Canada, the song debuted on the RPM 100 on October 20, 1990 at position 98. It peaked at number 28 during the week of December 8, 1990, and remained at that peak for two weeks.

Internationally, the single performed better. In the United Kingdom, the song premiered on the UK Singles Chart on September 30, 1990 at number 61, and rose over the following weeks to a peak of number fifteen on November 4, 1990. It charted best in the Netherlands' Nationale Top 100, where it reached a peak of number 12. On Belgium's Ultratop 50, it hit number 29. In Australasian territories, it charted right outside the top 40: in Australia, the song reached number 42, and in New Zealand, it peaked at number 46.

Reception
Upon its release, "The Obvious Child" received positive reviews from music critics of the time. Stephen Holden of The New York Times was perhaps the most effusive:

Greg Sandow of Entertainment Weekly praised the song's "confident drums that resound with special exuberant zing." A reviewer for People felt that "the more exotic musical elements are subsumed by Simon's pretty pop structures [...] You never get the impression that Paul has truly gone native or even considered it. He's more like a kid camping under the stars in his own backyard."

Reviews have remained very positive over time. Writer Steve Sullivan, in his book Encyclopedia of Great Popular Song Recordings, Volume 1 (2013), calls the song "an extraordinary work that surpasses any individual song Paul Simon had ever produced as a solo artist." Cameron Scheetz, in a 2014 article for The A.V. Club, examined the song; he called it "the perfect confluence of the wild, frenetic drumming and Simon's folksy melodies."

Promotion and use in media
Simon performed the song, accompanied by Olodum and Neguinho do Samba, on Saturday Night Live on November 17, 1990.

The song is the namesake for the 2014 film Obvious Child; it appears in a scene in which two characters drunkenly dance together. Director Gillian Robespierre titled the film with hope that its meaning would be ambiguous.

Formats and track listing
All songs written by Paul Simon, except where noted.

CD single (W9549CD)
"The Obvious Child" – 4:14
"The Rhythm of the Saints" – 4:21
"You Can Call Me Al" – 4:39
"The Boy in the Bubble" (Simon, Forere Motloheloa) – 3:58

7" single (W9549)
"The Obvious Child" (Single Mix) – 4:10
"The Rhythm of the Saints" – 4:19

12" single (W9549T)
"The Obvious Child" (Single Mix) – 4:10
"The Rhythm of the Saints" – 4:19
"You Can Call Me Al" – 4:40

Charts

Weekly charts

Year-end charts

Notes

References

Sources

External links

1990 singles
1990 songs
Paul Simon songs
Songs written by Paul Simon
Song recordings produced by Paul Simon
Warner Records singles